Carole Joan Crawford  (born 13 February 1943) is a Jamaican model and beauty queen who won the Miss World contest in 1963,  She was also the first winning delegate from both Jamaica and the Caribbean to have won Miss World.  At the time of her victory, she was 20 years old and stood at a height of only 5'3" (1.59 m), which was short by Miss World standards at the time. During the beauty competition, which was held in London, Crawford wore a specially designed swimsuit with a high neckline so that she would appear taller.

Her return to Jamaica, after her historic win in London, sparked a huge celebration: "The reception when I returned was simply fantastic. The airport was filled with people welcoming me. The Government had issued millions of commemorative stamps with my picture in my swimsuit on it. There were receptions with Sir Alexander Bustamante and Governor General Sir Clifford Campbell and his wife. I was presented with the gold key to the city of Kingston." In honor of her winning the Miss World title, the Jamaica Post issued a series of stamp imprinted with an image of Crawford wearing a swimsuit.

Today, Crawford resides in Canada, and is known as Carole Joan Crawford-Merkens.

References

1943 births
Living people
Miss World winners
Jamaican female models
Miss Jamaica World winners
Miss World 1963 delegates
People from Kingston, Jamaica
Jamaican emigrants to Canada